The Bholu Brothers were Pakistani wrestlers born into a family of Kashmiris of Punjab.  

The brothers were from the Gama wrestling family that lasted for many decades before the independence of Pakistan. This group included resident Pakistani champions such as Bholu Pahalwan, Azam Pahalwan, Aslam Pahalwan, Akram Pahalwan and Goga Pahalwan. These were the sons of Imam Baksh Pahalwan (Rustam-e-Hind). Nephews of Gama, the greatest wrestler that Pakistan had produced. Wrestling was a way of life for them. Some of the main wrestling gyms were owned and operated by the Bholu Pahalwan family (formerly known as Gama Wrestling Family).

Early days

The Great Bholu's Gym known as Dar-ul-Sehat was located in a building in the City of Karachi. It was a muddy wrestling arena within a vast courtyard that was surrounded by wooden benches. Pakistan's first Prime Minister, Liaquat Ali Khan allotted this building to this wrestling family to be used for training. It was once an akhara or traditional training hall where deshi kushti was practiced. The wrestling matches were called dangal, and were fought on a mud pit. The Government of Pakistan, until Ayub Khan's regime, regularly provided a special grant to Bholu Pahalwan family as recognition for their services to the sport. Earlier, every city, town and village of the country had its own akhara. The continuous flow of talent kept the game alive. And the Bholu's legacy rose to the highest ranks in the world of wrestling.

In earlier days when the sport of wrestling prevailed in Pakistan,  the passion for wrestling was such that the wrestling fans jam-packed the stadiums in almost every locality of Pakistan. Back then, the people used to gather on the streets just to catch a glimpse of a wrestler. The women and children crowded the rooftops of their dwellings just to watch the wrestlers go passing by on the streets in their horse-driven carriages. Those were the days when the  Pakistani Bholu Brothers were very popular in the East. They were renowned wrestlers with outstanding skills. The Bholu Brothers never needed an introduction in Asian community. People had a high regard for them and honored them as sports heroes.

Training
The Pakistani Bholu Brothers were trained by Gama Pahalwan, known as the Great Gama in the Indian Subcontinent. There was a time when they were outstanding wrestlers. They remained major players of the game in the region after independence in 1947. Soon Afterwards, Bholu Pahalwan acquired the title of Rustam-e-Pakistan in 1949. His younger brother Aslam Pahalwan successfully conquered the Rustam-e-Punjab title in 1951. Azam was declared Rustam-e-Hind in 1953. Goga was better known as the resident Champion. They were from among the people who came to Lahore from Amritsar after independence in 1947.  And today when the Bholu Brothers have long since departed from this world, we cannot talk about the Pakistani wrestling without recalling these Wrestling Greats.

Notable wrestlers

Bholu Pahalwan

Bholu Pahalwan, real name Manzoor Hussain (1922–1985) was a famous Pakistani wrestler, and the very first champion of the newly independent Pakistan. 

He was the eldest son of Imam Baksh Pahalwan - Rustam-i-Hind (Champion Wrestler of India). He was born in 1922 in Amritsar, India. He represented the Gama Wrestling Family.   He started his career in British India. He fought his first wrestling match in March 1939 at Minto Park (now called Iqbal Park), Lahore against Ahmad Bakhsh. He defeated the famous Mangal Singh and Tarraka before 1947. Bholu also defeated wrestlers from the west like Karl Pojello, George Zbisko, Zbisko-II, Emil Koroshenko, Baron Von Heckzey and Jeji Goldstein during the earlier days. He won the Rustam-e-Pakistan title in April 1949 by defeating the No.1 Pakistani wrestler, Younus Gujranwalia of Punjab. The Governor General of Pakistan, Khwaja Nazimuddin awarded him the Championship Mace. In 1962, the Pakistani President, Muhammad Ayub Khan gave him the  Pride of Performance Award. 

In 1964, he was declared Rustam-e-Zaman (world champion) by the All Pakistan Wrestling Association, conditionally. In May 1967, he defeated the Anglo-French Champion, Henri Pierlot (Les Thornton) for the World title in London, England. In September 1967, Bholu was declared the Rustam-e-Zaman (world champion) by the All Pakistan Wrestling Association for the second time.

Aslam Pahalwan

Aslam Pahalwan alias Achcha (1927–1989) The world-renowned Pakistani champion, was the adopted son of The Great Gama, and the backbone muscle of Pakistani wrestling faction. Aslam was a comical figure in real life but turned furious and powerful when he entered the ring. He weighed more than 300 lbs and stood 6 ft 4 in tall. He was trained in extreme wrestling environments by the superman of Indian wrestling known as Hamida Pahalwan.  He mostly participated in shoot bouts. He was licensed in freestyle wrestling as well as Indian Martial arts.

Aslam began his career before independence of Pakistan. He gained fame by beating the very superior, Kala Pehalwan, "the lion of Punjab". He  won the Rustam-e-Punjab title in 1951 by beating the top Pakistani wrestler known as Younus Pahalwan (a.k.a. Younus Gujranwala) of Gujranwala. In 1953 he wrestled in Nairobi and defeated their champion Mahender Singh. He also acquired the Commonwealth title in 1953.  He became known throughout the world when he defeated the Empire Champion, Bert Assirati in 1954. He wrestled in Asia, Far East, East Africa, Europe, South America and Middle East and defeated some famous names including George Gordienko, Sheik Ali, Roy Heffernan and King Kong Czaya. He has also defeated big names in Indian wrestling such as Arjun Singh, Tiger Joginder Singh, Tarlok Singh and Paul Vachon. According to Paul Butcher vachon, all the matches that he had with the Bholu Brothers were shoots. He has written three books about his life as a Professional Wrestler titled. When Wrestling Was Real.

Azam Pahalawan
Azam Pehalwan Rustam-e-Hind was the Champion of Lahore and the Far East.  He was a conventional wrestler, a Pahalwan who later adopted the freestyle professional wrestling. Azam alias Raja was born in 1925,  in Amritsar, India. He was an introvert and religious type of person. He faced many grapplers in Pakistan,  India, Kuwait, Muscat, Behrain, Qatar, Kenya, Uganda and South America.  Azam was strong and flexible as a cat. Whenever thrown on the mat, he always landed on his feet's. With a bodyweight of only 180 lbs he could tackle the super heavyweights like the Gora Singh and Baron Von Heckzey. In United Kingdom he defeated the American Champion, Ron Reed. In Surinam he defeated the wrestling champion and Karate buff, Antel Haiti (Geisingh). He also vanquished well known wrestlers like Jeji Goldstein, George Penchef, Big Bill Verna, Zebra Kid, Ron Harrison, Bloorma, Tiger Joginder and Arjun Singh.

Akram Pahalawan
Akram Pehalawan alias Akki excelled in Earthen Pit wrestling and boxing type wrestling. Born around 1930, in Amritsar, Punjab, India, he weighed close to 250 lbs. and stood 6 feet tall in his prime. In 1953, he was given the name "double Tiger" in East Africa after his victories over the wrestlers of the Dark Continent. He defeated Ugandan champion Idi Amin in Kampala. He trounced all opposition in Kenya including their champion, Mahinder Singh. He also competed in the Tag Team events along with brother Aslam and Goga.  Amongst the six wrestler sons of Imam Bakhsh Pahalwan,  Akki was perhaps the most graceful and fastest. He started his career in teen years and soon hit into prominence.  Initially he was a student of Gama, and started competing from Lahore. During his early days he met the much superior Kala Pahalwan, "the Lion of Punjab" and lost the match. But the later did not give Akram the return bout and pitted his numerous pupils to halt the victory march of this No.3 wrestler of the Indo-Pakistan. In 1954, Akram went to Bombay and there he had a series of matches without a loss. After his return to Pakistan Akram challenged all opposition at home. The champion of Multan, the powerful, Zamman khan disputed his claim and tangled with him. But the latter proved better than the khan of Multan and defeated him. Later Akram and his brothers toured Malaya in 1958. There he beats their Idol, Hari Ram in a challenge bout. Then in a match in Chittagong against Big Bill Verna of Australia, he dislocated his left shoulder and was hospitalized. But even then he evaded defeat and the match ended in a draw. When his shoulder healed, Akram was back in action and agreed to tangle with the giant King Kong of Hungary.

In this bout Akram defeated King Kong (Emile Czaja) in three rounds. And when the new threat to the Bholu Brothers in person of Bhola Gadi, the champion of Lahore defeated the Bholu brother, Azam alias Raja in May 1962, in the historical cities championship tournament. Akram then wrestled Bhola Gadi at Iqbal Park, Lahore in a challenge match. On this occasion, after a furious struggle between the pair Akram lifted Bhola Gadi sky-high and slammed him on the mat for the initial three counts. Hence the next opponent for Akram was the highly reputed Haji Afzal, a very clever but lighter wrestler. But this proved Afzal's turning point and Afzal was pinned in 15 minutes. In Nepal, Akram defeated the Kabul champion, Sardar Khan. Then in a challenge fight he trounced Pyara Singh of Indian, Punjab. Some of his memorable victories are over Haji Afzal, King Kong, Aussie, Clyde Kennedy, Hardam Singh, Gurnam Singh, Hari Ram,  Emile Koroshenko, Tony Kontellis, Con Papalazarou,  Baron Von Heczey, Bloorma, Sam Betts  and George Gordianko. He drew matches against Shaikh Wadi Ayoub, Bert Assirati and Big Bill Verna. Akram has lost some of the fights but his overall performance was good.  He has suffered defeat at the hands of Kala Pahalwan "the Lion of Punjab" during the 1950s, Big Bill Verna and the 3 times world Judo champion Anton Geesink in South America in 1968. Akram remained active in professional wrestling until he lost an important match of his career against Antonio Inoki in 1976.

Goga Pahalawan
Goga Pehalwan real name Moazzam, (1937–1981) was fearless and daring Pakistani wrestler. He comes from the household brimming with wrestling victories. A part of the Pakistani Bholu Brothers wrestling team. The 1937, Amritsar born Pakistani Champion, was trained by the Great Gama of India for 15 years. He was lightly built and displayed a blazing fighting style with quick reflexes. Some of his Favorite maneuvers were Reverse flying kick and leg breaker. Goga feuded with a number of famous wrestlers including Tiger Jogindar, Gunpat Andolkar, Eric Taylor, Earl Maynard, Killer Karl Kox, Zebra Kid, Wanik Buckley, Louis Kovacs, Kid Zemboa, Billy Robinson,  Klondyke Bill, Dick Murdoch, Dusty Rhodes, Sam Betts, Haruka Eigen, Tarlok Singh and Harbans Singh. His local opponents included Haji Afzal, Boonta Singh, Siddique Nukehwala,  Sohni and Garnam Singh. However Goga lost a few matches to wrestlers like Sam Betts. In professional Tag team wrestling he teamed with Akram Pehalwan and Majid Ackra. Goga died in Gujranwala City on 6 February 1981 during an exhibition bout against his nephew Nasir Bholu.

Hassu
Hassu real name Hussain Bakhsh, was the second eldest son of Imam Bux and perhaps the earlier member of Bholu brothers. His real name was Hussain Bakhsh. He was a part of the Bholu Brothers team of wrestling but his name was never heard publicly because he gave up wrestling earlier, so he is not well known among the wrestling fans like his brothers.

References

Pakistani people of Kashmiri descent
Recipients of the Pride of Performance
Pakistani professional wrestlers